Reda v Flag Ltd [2002] UKPC 38 is a case from Bermuda law, advised upon by the Privy Council, that is relevant for UK labour law and UK company law concerning the dismissal of a director.

Facts
Mr Reda and Mr Abdul Jalil were senior executives of Flag Ltd in Bermuda and had contractual rights to the employee benefit schemes and pay linked to the chief executive’s. Their contracts also said they could be terminated with or without cause. A new chief executive was appointed on a higher salary and they were asked to waive their right to their contracts to be linked. They declined and they were then terminated. Flag Ltd then established a management share option scheme. Flag Ltd wished to have a declaration about the sums due to the directors.

Advice

Bermuda Courts
The judge held that the termination of their employment was to prevent them becoming eligible so they should be paid the linked salaries and because they were in fact entitled to reasonable notice they got the options.

The Court of Appeal of Bermuda held that the employment was validly terminated and they were not entitled to participate in the share option scheme.

Privy Council
Lord Millett advised the executives were not entitled to the stock options. Flag Ltd had been entitled to terminate the contracts without cause, and this was not affected by the motive behind the decision to dismiss. The power to terminate did not breach the implied term of trust and confidence, and no requirement for reasonable notice could be implied given the express term allowing for termination of the fixed term contracts.
An express contractual provision to dismiss someone without cause could not be circumscribed by implied terms about notice or good faith.

Lord Millett also referred to Aspden v Webbs Poultry & Meat Group (Holding) Ltd [1996] IRLR 521, where Sedley J said the express term could be interpreted in light of the implied term, which was necessary to imply.

Lord Nicholls, Lord Mackay, Lord Hope and Lord Hutton concurred.

See also

UK labour law

Notes

References

United Kingdom labour case law
Judicial Committee of the Privy Council cases on appeal from Bermuda
2002 in British law
2002 in case law
2002 in Bermuda